Calocoris nemoralis is a species of true bugs belonging to the family Miridae or jumping tree bugs, subfamily Mirinae.

Forms
Forms within this species include:
Calocoris nemoralis f. bimaculata
Calocoris nemoralis f. hexastigma
Calocoris nemoralis f. hispanica Gmel.
Calocoris nemoralis f. picea Cyr.
Calocoris nemoralis f. nigrovittata Costa
Calocoris nemoralis f. erytrocephala Mancini
Calocoris nemoralis f. vittata

Distribution
This species can be found in most of Southern Europe (Cyprus, European Turkey, France, Germany, Greece, Italy, Malta. Portugal and Spain).

Description

Bodies af these bugs are elongated. The head is black, very rarely clear. The dorsal surface is covered with dense black hairs. The membrane is black. Legs are black, femurs and tibiae are often partly red or yellow.

Calocoris nemoralis is usually red coloured with black dots. This species presents many forms, with an enormous variability in colors, that may be white, black, gray, yellowish, greenish or blood red, with and without black spots.

Biology
Adults of these bugs can be found from June to September. The main host plants are Cirsium, Carduus and Silybum species. Eggs overwinter.

References

External links
Discover Life
Pino Grasso Photography
 Biodiversidad Virtual
 Insectes

Hemiptera of Europe
Insects described in 1787
Mirini